The 2006–07 Druga HNL season was the 16th since its establishment. The first placed team were Inter Zaprešić and the last three clubs were relegated to Treća HNL.

Teams competing in 2006-07

Belišće
Bjelovar
Croatia Sesvete
Čakovec
Hrvatski Dragovoljac
Imotski
Inter Zaprešić
Koprivnica
Marsonia
Moslavina
Mosor
Naftaš HAŠK
Pomorac
Solin
Vukovar '91
Zadar

League table

Promotions and relegations in 2006
 Promoted to Prva HNL: HNK Šibenik
 Relegated from Prva HNL: NK Inter Zaprešić
 Promoted from the Treća HNL: NK Moslavina

Top scorers

External links
League's official website 

First Football League (Croatia) seasons
Drug
Cro